Dimitrije Pejanović (born 9 July 1974) is a Serbian former handball player.

Club career
Over the course of his career that spanned more than two decades, Pejanović spent 11 seasons in Spain. He played for four Liga ASOBAL teams, namely Almería, Torrevieja, Granollers, and Huesca.

International career
At international level, Pejanović represented Serbia in three major tournaments.

Honours
Panellinios
 Greek Men's Handball Championship: 2001–02
 Greek Men's Handball Cup: 2001–02

References

External links
 

1974 births
Living people
Sportspeople from Sombor
Serbia and Montenegro male handball players
Serbian male handball players
RK Crvenka players
RK Crvena zvezda players
CB Torrevieja players
BM Granollers players
Liga ASOBAL players
Expatriate handball players
Serbia and Montenegro expatriate sportspeople in Greece
Serbia and Montenegro expatriate sportspeople in Spain
Serbian expatriate sportspeople in Spain
Serbian expatriate sportspeople in Belarus
Serbian expatriate sportspeople in Qatar